Saturn Award for Best DVD or Blu-ray Release (formerly Saturn Award for Best DVD Release) is an award presented by the Academy of Science Fiction, Fantasy and Horror Films for each film considered to be released either on DVD or on Blu-ray or both sometimes. The following is a list of the winners of this award:

Winners

References 

DVD Release